Severe Tropical Cyclone Wasa–Arthur was the first major tropical cyclone to affect French Polynesia and Tahiti since the 1982–83 season. The system was first noted on December 3, 1991, as a shallow tropical depression that was embedded within the monsoon trough, to the north of the Cook Island: Rarotonga. Over the next couple of days the system gradually developed further, before it was classified as a tropical cyclone and named Wasa during December 5. The system gradually strengthened further and acquired hurricane-force winds on December 6, as it performed a small clockwise loop. After completing the loop, Wasa moved southwards before it peaked in intensity during December 8, with sustained wind speeds of 165 km/h (105 mph). Over the next few days the system started to weaken as it passed through the French Polynesian Society Islands, and became the first major tropical cyclone to affect French Polynesia since 1983.

During December 12, Wasa passed through the French Polynesian Austral Islands and passed directly over Tubuai, before it degenerated into a tropical depression later that day. However, gale-force winds remained associated with the depression, before the system turned towards the east-northeast and entered into warmer waters near the Tuamotu Islands. During December 14, Wasa regenerated into a tropical depression and was renamed Arthur. During that day the system gradually intensified before it reached its secondary peak intensity with sustained wind speeds of 95 km/h (60 mph). During December 15, the system maintained its peak intensity, as it moved through the uninhabited Acteon Group of islands, before during the next day it started to gradually weaken. Arthur degenerated into a shallow depression during December 17, before it was last noted during the next day as it dissipated to the north of the Pitcairn islands.

Tourists on the island of Bora Bora were evacuated to a local church, after Wasa–Arthur had swept high seas into tourist bungalows. Overall the system caused an estimated US$60 million in damage within French Polynesia, with the majority of the damage done between December 9 – 12. The system destroyed or damaged several homes, a variety of crops and damaged several public buildings, hotels, roads and power installations, with the worst affected islands being Bora Bora and Tubuai. On Rurutu island, Moerai harbour was destroyed by a cyclonic swell generated by the system, while the local school and police station were destroyed by high waves. Two people were killed after torrential rainfall from the system caused a mudslide on the island of Moorea, during a night of torrential rain the day after Wasa had made its closest approach to the island. The French Government incurred costs of about FF68 million including FF53 million for the efforts of the French Military. The French Polynesian Government subsequently borrowed FF55 million and built up a fund from local banks of about FF1.5 billion, to help with the reconstruction. The name Wasa was later retired, from the list of tropical cyclone names by the World Meteorological Organization.

Meteorological history

During December 3, 1991, the Fiji Meteorological Service (FMS) started to monitor a tropical depression, that was embedded within a monsoon trough of low pressure over the Northern Cook Islands. Over the next couple of days, the system gradually developed further as it moved south-westwards, before the United States Naval Western Oceanography Center (NWOC) initiated advisories on the system and designated it as Tropical Cyclone 07P during December 5. Over the next day, Wasa quickly intensified and made a small cyclonic loop, before it was classified as a Category 3 severe tropical cyclone during December 7.

After Wasa had passed over Tubuai, the FMS reported that Wasa had weakened below tropical cyclone strength and degenerated into a depression. Over the next day, gale-force winds persisted within the depression's southeastern quadrant, as it moved towards the east-northeast and into warmer waters near the Tuamotu Islands. During December 13, the NWOC issued their final warning on the system, before the FMS reported during the next day that Wasa had regenerated into a tropical cyclone. However, for convenience, operational purposes and to avoid any potential confusion among recipients of the warnings, the FMS decided to rename the system: Arthur. Over the next day, Wasa-Arthur maintained its intensity as it moved north-eastwards through the northern islands of the Acteon Group, before the NWOC classified the system as Tropical Cyclone 08P during December 15. Wasa-Arthur subsequently started to gradually weaken as it turned eastwards, before the FMS and the NWOC reported that it had degenerated into a depression during December 17.

Preparations and impact

Severe Tropical Cyclone Wasa–Arthur was the first major tropical cyclone to impact French Polynesia since the 1982–83 season. It impacted various parts of the island nation between December 6 - 14, with the majority of the damage caused to the Society and Austral Islands during its first stage as a tropical cyclone. Ahead of the system impacting the island nation, various watches and warnings were issued, including a red alert for Tahiti, which banned all road traffic and navigation around the islands. The system brought strong winds, flooding, heavy rain, high seas, swells and a storm surge to the island nation.

Society Islands
Strong winds were recorded within the Leeward Islands, which destroyed hundreds of houses, devastated crops and uprooted trees. A swell of  submerged the islands of Manuae, Motu One and Mopelia. On Mopelia atoll, the 66 inhabitants of the island attached themselves to poles, in order to ensure that they were not swept away by Wasa's high waves.

Austral Islands

In Rurutu on Tubuai, the local school and police station were destroyed by high waves, which also damaged stretches of the coastal highway.

Original
On December 12, tourists on the island of Bora Bora were evacuated to a local church, after the system had swept high seas into tourist bungalows. The system destroyed 367 homes, damaged 855 other homes, destroyed or damaged a variety of crops and damaged several public buildings, hotels, roads and power installations, with the worst affected islands were Bora Bora and Tubuai. On Rurutu island, Moerai harbour was destroyed by a cyclonic swell generated by the system, while the local school and police station were destroyed by high waves. A women and her child were killed while asleep, after torrential rainfall from Wasa caused a mudslide on the island of Moorea the day after the system had made its closest approach to the island.

Aftermath
During the aftermath of the cyclone, a French Military cargo plane and several helicopters carried out initial relief efforts to several of the islands affected by Wasa, before the French Polynesian Government and private cargo ships continued the effort, by carrying emergency relief supplies and reconstruction materials. The French Government's Minister for Overseas France: Louis Le Pensec arrived in Tahiti on December 15, to inspect the damage and explore ways of rebuilding the island nation, after similar tours were conducted by the President of French Polynesia, Gaston Flosse and several of his cabinet ministers. During the emergency period, the French Government incurred costs of about  including  for the efforts of the French Military. The name Wasa was later retired, from the list of tropical cyclone names by the World Meteorological Organization.

See also

Cyclone Martin
Cyclone Oli

References

External links

1991–92 South Pacific cyclone season
Category 4 South Pacific cyclones
Tropical cyclones in French Polynesia
Retired South Pacific cyclones
1991 in French Polynesia